Fueradeserie! is a record label based in Barcelona which focuses on no-commercial electronic music, and its sounds ranges from sound experimentation, conceptual micro-minimalism or last generation folktronica.
The label was founded by Jose Antonio Sepúlveda (a.k.a. Men-t-zero) and Estefania Serrano (a.k.a. Littleprettyautomatique in 2002.
Fueradeserie! has released music from Anders Ilar, Monoceros, Esqueleto, Maco and Equipo, and a compilation, Snowdrop, with music from Skyphone, Apparat, Multiplex, .tape., Krikor, Solenoid or Sink among others.

See also
 List of record labels

External links
 fueradeserie.org

Spanish record labels
Record labels established in 2002
Electronic music record labels
2002 establishments in Spain